Jarchi may refer to:
Jarchi, a village in northern Iran
The Jarchi Mosque in Ishafan, Iran
The mediaeval French rabbi Rashi, also known as Jarchi